Wheatland Reservoir is the name of three reservoirs located near Wheatland in the U.S. State of Wyoming.  Wheatland Reservoir Number 1 is located nearest to the town of Wheatland.  It was formed by impounding Canal No 3 which is fed by Sybille Creek coming off the eastern slope of the Laramie Mountains.  Wheatland Reservoir Number 2 is located on the western side of the Laramie Mountains. It was formed by impounding the Laramie River.  Nearby Wheatland Reservoir Number 3 is fed by a canal from Reservoir Number 2 and the Laramie River.

See also
 List of largest reservoirs of Wyoming

External links 

  at  
  at 
  at 

Lakes of Albany County, Wyoming
Lakes of Platte County, Wyoming
Reservoirs in Wyoming